Pedro Bernardi (born 16 April 1991) is a Brazilian tennis player.

Bernardi has a career high ATP singles ranking of 946 achieved on 12 January 2015. He also has a career high ATP doubles ranking of 294 achieved on 8 May 2017.

Bernardi made his ATP main draw debut at the 2016 Brasil Open in the doubles draw partnering Guilherme Clezar.

References

External links

1991 births
Living people
Brazilian male tennis players
Sportspeople from Belo Horizonte